Luanamo is an island in Lulunga district, in the Ha'apai islands of Tonga.

On December 16, 2011, a fisherman died at the island while searching for sea cucumbers.

References 

Islands of Tonga
Haʻapai